Coatesville or Coatsville may refer to:

 Coatesville, Indiana
 Coatsville, Missouri
 Coatesville, Pennsylvania
 Coatesville, New Zealand
 a locality in the suburb of Bentleigh East, Melbourne, Australia